All Souls is a compilation album by British rock band Siouxsie and the Banshees, released on 21 October 2022. It is a collection of singles, album tracks and curated B-sides. It was conceived by Siouxsie Sioux as a seasonal compilation "to celebrate the autumn equinox and its festivities".

Background 
In June 2022, vocalist Siouxsie Sioux assisted in the half-speed remastering of ten Siouxsie and the Banshees tracks at Abbey Road Studios by Miles Showell. The songs were compiled into the album for "autumnal celebration" All Souls, released on 180 gram black vinyl and on limited edition orange vinyl, as well as on streaming platforms.

The track listing, curated by Siouxsie herself, compiles songs referencing the occult, death and autumnal festivities, such as Day of the Dead/All Souls' Day (in "El Dia De Los Muertos", originally a B-side from "The Last Beat of My Heart" single) and Halloween (in "Halloween", originally released on Juju). The compilation includes other lesser known album tracks and B-sides, as well as "Fireworks", "Peek-a-Boo", and "Spellbound". This last song featured in the end credits of "The Piggyback", the finale of the fourth season of Stranger Things, earlier in the year. 

The cover design was directed by Siouxsie and features a marigold, a symbol of the Mexican Day of the Dead festivities. Marigolds are also mentioned in the lyrics of "El Dia De Los Muertos".

Critical reception 

Pat Gilbert from Mojo gave the album four stars out of five, calling the track selection "an uneven 10-track mix of hits, LP tracks and B-sides that don't so much make you feel especially spooked as marvel at the Banshees' many nuanced evolutions". Spin wrote that "All Souls is a balance of hits and rarities that fans can enjoy all year" and that the album was "a great gift for both longtime Siouxsie fans and those of you who are just catching on to her about hearing 'Spellbound' in the fourth season of Stranger Things".

Track listing

Charts

References 

2022 compilation albums
Siouxsie and the Banshees compilation albums
Universal Music Group compilation albums